The First Beautiful Thing is a 2010 Italian drama film directed by Paolo Virzì, produced by Medusa Film, Motorino Amaranto and Indiana Production, released in Italy on 15 January 2010. The film stars Micaela Ramazzotti, Valerio Mastandrea, Claudia Pandolfi and Stefania Sandrelli. On 9 November 2010 the film opened at the Cinema Italian style Film Festival in Los Angeles.

Plot
The film tells the story of the Michelucci family, from the 1970s to the present day: the central character is the stunningly beautiful Anna, the lively, frivolous and sometimes embarrassing mother of Bruno and Valeria. Everything begins in the Summer of 1971, at the annual Summer beauty pageant held at Livorno’s most popular bathing establishment. Anna is unexpectedly crowned “Most Beautiful Mother”, unwittingly stirring the violent jealousy of her husband, a Non-commissioned officer of Carabinieri. From then on, chaos strikes the family and for Anna, Bruno and his sister Valeria, it is the start of an adventure that will only end thirty years later. The whole movie is set when Bruno, a high school teacher who ended up living in Milan after managing to escape from Livorno and his mother, returns to his hometown to be at his mother’s side during her very last days, remembering many of the key episodes of his family life through a long series of flashbacks.

Cast
 Valerio Mastandrea as Bruno Michelucci
 Micaela Ramazzotti as Anna Nigiotti in Michelucci - 1971-1981
 Stefania Sandrelli as Anna Nigiotti in Michelucci - 2008
 Claudia Pandolfi as Valeria Michelucci
 Marco Messeri as Il Nesi
 Fabrizia Sacchi as Sandra
 Aurora Frasca as Valeria Michelucci - child
 Giacomo Bibbiani as Bruno Michelucci - child
 Giulia Burgalassi as Valeria Michelucci - teenager
 Francesco Rapalino as Bruno - teenager
 Sergio Albelli as Mario Michelucci
 Isabella Cecchi as Zia Leda Nigiotti
 Emanuele Barresi as Roberto Lenzi
 Dario Ballantini as Avvocato Cenerini
 Paolo Ruffini as Cristiano Cenerini

Awards and nominations
The film was nominated for 18 David di Donatello Awards, and won Best Screenplay (Paolo Virzì, Francesco Bruni, Francesco Piccolo), Best Actress Micaela Ramazzotti Best Actor Valerio Mastandrea. 4 Silver Ribbon, Director of the best film Paolo Virzì, Best screenplay, Best Actress Stefania Sandrelli and Micaela Ramazzotti, Best Costume Gabriella Pescucci.  The film was nominated for the European Film Award for Best Director. It was selected as the Italian entry for the Best Foreign Language Film at the 83rd Academy Awards, but it didn't make the final shortlist.

In July 2010, La prima cosa bella (The first beautiful Thing) won four Silver Ribbon awards: Director of the Best Film of the Year (Paolo Virzi), Best Actress Micaela Ramazzotti and Stefania Sandrelli, Best Screenplay Paolo Virzi, Francesco Bruni, Francesco Piccolo) and Best Costume Design to the Oscar winner Gabriella Pescucci. The film was screened at some international film festivals including the Open Roads, New York, the Shanghai International Film Festival, the Annecy Cinéma Italien Film Festival and the NICE Italian Film Festival, San Francisco.

See also
 List of submissions to the 83rd Academy Awards for Best Foreign Language Film
 List of Italian submissions for the Academy Award for Best Foreign Language Film

References

External links

2010 films
2010 comedy-drama films
Films directed by Paolo Virzì
Italian comedy-drama films
2010s Italian-language films
Films about dysfunctional families
Films set in Livorno